Albert von Einsiedel (14 May 1917 – August 1999) was a Filipino sports shooter. He competed in two events at the 1948 Summer Olympics.

References

External links
 

1917 births
1999 deaths
Filipino male sport shooters
Olympic shooters of the Philippines
Shooters at the 1948 Summer Olympics
Asian Games medalists in shooting
Shooters at the 1954 Asian Games
Medalists at the 1954 Asian Games
Asian Games gold medalists for the Philippines
Asian Games silver medalists for the Philippines
Place of birth missing
20th-century Filipino people